Denise Frossard Loschi (Carangola, October 6, 1950) is a judge and politician from Brazil. She studied law and served as a magistrate in Rio de Janeiro. She has been a law professor at the Getúlio Vargas Foundation. When she retired she started working for Transparency International.

She was the trial judge who on May 14, 1993, convicted 14 notorious racketeers who control the lucrative Jogo do Bicho (the “animal game” – an illegal but popular numbers gamble) in Rio de Janeiro.  The so-called bicheiros were a notorious source of corruption of police officers, politicians, part of the media and even social organisations such as the samba schools, that organise Rio's world-famous Carnival parades, a huge source of tourist income to both the city and the state). Frossard sentenced them to six years' imprisonment. The sentence recognized the existence of a mafia-type organization in Brazil for the first time. Editorial pages of Brazilian newspapers praised Frossard's courage to take on the illegal lottery bosses.

"The animal game is a deeply embedded cultural phenomenon with a certain romantic aura, and thus hard to eradicate," according to Frossard.  "But it is also a quintessentially Brazilian way of laundering money and contributes greatly to the problem of impunity in this country." Judge Frossard was subjected to pressures from both the political establishment and the Judiciary itself and her life has been threatened. She has been the target of assassination attempts that she attributes to hired guns in the pay of game kingpins. A former military policeman allegedly received an offer of US$270,000 (R$1 million) to kill Frossard, but was arrested before he could commit the murder.

After the judgment in 1993, she spent a year in the United States, returning to head the Brazilian branches of Transparency International and the Women's Bank.

In 2002, she was elected as federal representative for the Socialist People's Party (Partido Popular Socialista, PPS) to the Brazilian Congress. She won the election in the State of Rio de Janeiro with a landslide, winning more votes in that election than any of her colleagues. Her term ended in 2006, after which she ran for governor of the State of Rio de Janeiro. With 32% of the valid votes, she lost in the run-off from Sérgio Cabral Filho, the candidate for the Brazilian Democratic Movement Party (Partido do Movimento Democrático Brasileiro, PMDB), who won 68% of the votes.

In 2005 she received the Medalha Tiradentes by the Legislative Assembly of the State of Rio de Janeiro, for relevant services offered to the State of Rio de Janeiro.

References

1950 births
Living people
Brazilian women judges
20th-century Brazilian judges
Brazilian women in politics
Jogo do Bicho
Cidadania politicians
Members of the Chamber of Deputies (Brazil) from Rio de Janeiro (state)
20th-century women judges